The Beyond were a progressive metal band from Derby, England. The band performed under this name between 1988 and 1993, and then under the name Gorilla from 1995 to 1998.

History

The Beyond (1988–1993)
The Beyond formed in their home town of Derby in mid-1988 around the nucleus of Andy Gatford (guitars) and Neil Cooper (drums), who had played together since the age of 15. They were joined by schoolmate John Whitby (vocals) and Paul Fallon (bass). Soon, Fallon was replaced on bass by Jim Kersey

Crawl
The Beyond signed a publishing deal with Island Music and a development deal with EMI. Conscious of the inestimable value of grassroots development, The Beyond passed on major options the first time out, releasing the Manic Sound Panic EP on UK record label Big Cat. An impressive agenda of live work ensued including support slots with the Red Hot Chili Peppers, Soundgarden, Claytown Troupe, Acid Reign, and Xentrix. Their first album, Crawl, was released in April 1991,  on the EMI subsidiary label Harvest and includes the singles One Step Too Far, Empire, and The Raging E.P. which took the band into the UK Top 75. Crawl was produced by Barry Clempson (Depeche Mode, The The). Following its release, more touring ensued, this time including a full European tour with Living Colour.

A unique arrangement between EMI and the US-based independent company Continuum withdrew The Beyond from their contract with EMI USA in order to develop the band through a more appropriate and streetwise independent avenue. The following year, Crawl was released in the US on the Continuum label with a revised track listing ('Second Sight' was replaced by former UK b-sides 'Nail' and 'Everybody Wins'), followed subsequently by a European support slot to Canadian band Rush.

Chasm
During time spent in the USA, while Crawl was receiving rave reviews, The Beyond met Jim 'Foetus' Thirlwell and decided he should produce their second album titled 'Chasm'. Once again, The Beyond decided to go the independent route. A deal between EMI UK and Music For Nations saw Music For Nations marketing and distributing Chasm in Europe. The J. G.
Thirlwell-produced Chasm was released on the 13th of April 1993.

By 1994, The Beyond had gone into hiatus. Drummer Neil Cooper made up the original line up of noise-rockers Cable, but left in '95 to
rejoin Whitby and Gatford on a new project...

Gorilla (1995–1998) 
Gorilla (completed by David Petty on bass and Andy Lingard on violin) released their first Demo which consisted of 3 tracks, 'Dream on', 'Ripe' (although in some versions this track was called 'Urban Pygmy') and 'Ping'. Followed shortly after by their first EP 'Extended Play' in 1995 on the Embryo label followed by 'The Shutdown EP' on the Disinformation label. Again, the band had further streamlined their sound, heavier than before, but with less complexity in the playing, allowing John Whitby's infectious hooks to stand out. In 1997 and 1998, Gorilla released the 'Who Wants to Save the World Anyway?', and 'Outside' singles. These proved to be their last singles. Andy Lingard left the band and Gorilla briefly continued as a four-piece before disbanding.

Recent history
In 2002 Neil Cooper joined established Northern Irish alternative metal band Therapy?.

Andy Gatford (under the moniker Leon Black) and Jim Kersey (now James Kersey) formed lo-fi indie band Leon with Keyboardist Lee Horsley and drummer Jeff Davenport in 2004, Gatford providing lead vocals and guitar. Their 2005 debut album, Uppers and Downers had a positive reaction from radio and press; "A goddamn catchy little beggar." - Garry Mulholland (Q Magazine, Observer Music Monthly) "Leon are a sweet band with a stiletto blade in each hand...good attitude." – NME "Tuneful pop, so memorable, an achievement." - Daily Mirror Single of the Week "Slick and scuzzy lo-fi pop rocking thats as cool and crisp as its fuzzy." - Unpeeled Review. The singles from Uppers and Downers received radio play on XFM (playlist and session), Radio 2 (Jonathan Ross, Janice Long session), BBC6 Music and Kerrang FM. Kersey and Davenport have since been replaced by Paul Whittington (bass) and Frazer M Knight (drums).

In late 2008, Leon changed their name to Eskimo Fires and Andy Gatford changed his stage name from Leon Black to Andy Black.

In May 2010, John Whitby was elected a Labour councillor for Derby City Council and in 2017 was elected the Mayor of Derby.

In February 2018, the 1990–94 lineup of The Beyond performed a charity gig at The Venue on Abbey Street. The event raised more than £5,000 for Derbyshire Children's Holiday Centre, Children First, Safe and Sound, the British Red Cross and the Derby Museums Trust.

Discography
as The Beyond

Demos

Singles / E.P.s

Albums

as Gorilla

Demos

Singles / E.P.s

Samples and allusions
The sample "It's all there. Black and white, clear as crystal!" 1m 11sec into "Everybody Wins" by The Beyond is Gene Wilder in the 1971 movie Willy Wonka & the Chocolate Factory.
The sample "We came to wreck everything and ruin your life. God sent us" at the beginning of Acid Test by Gorilla is taken from 1992 Australian movie Romper Stomper starring Russell Crowe. Post-hardcore band Aiden sampled the same dialogue on the title track of their 2004 album Our Gang's Dark Oath.
The track "Limbo" from 2003 Therapy? album High Anxiety (Neil's first with the band) includes the lyric 'on the eve of my release' - a reference to The Beyond track "The Eve of My Release".

References

English heavy metal musical groups
Musical groups established in 1988
Harvest Records artists